Jörgen Holmberg (born 27 June 1962) is a retired Swedish ice hockey player. Holmberg was part of the Djurgården Swedish champions' team of 1983. Holmberg made 114 Elitserien appearances for Djurgården.

References

Swedish ice hockey players
Djurgårdens IF Hockey players
1962 births
Living people